Lisa Boscarino (born 18 May 1961) is a Puerto Rican judoka. She competed in the women's half-lightweight event at the 1992 Summer Olympics.

References

External links
 

1961 births
Living people
Puerto Rican female judoka
Olympic judoka of Puerto Rico
Judoka at the 1992 Summer Olympics
Place of birth missing (living people)
Pan American Games medalists in judo
Pan American Games gold medalists for Puerto Rico
Pan American Games bronze medalists for Puerto Rico
Judoka at the 1987 Pan American Games
Judoka at the 1991 Pan American Games
Medalists at the 1987 Pan American Games
Medalists at the 1991 Pan American Games
20th-century Puerto Rican women